Soh is a surname in various cultures.

Origins
Soh may be:
 A spelling of the pronunciation in some varieties of Chinese (such as Cantonese or Hokkien) of the Chinese surname spelled in Mandarin Pinyin as Sū
 An alternative spelling of the Korean surnames spelled in the Revised Romanization of Korean (RR) as Seo or So
 An alternative spelling of the Japanese surname Sō

Statistics
The 2000 South Korean census found 49,456 people with the surname spelled So in RR, and 695,241 with the surname spelled Seo in RR. The former surname is spelled as Soh relatively frequently, but the latter surname is not. In a study based on a sample of applications for South Korean passports in 2007, 8.9% of people with the surname spelled So in RR chose to spell it as Soh in their passports, but none of the people with the surname spelled Seo in RR chose to spell it as Soh in their passports.

According to statistics cited by Patrick Hanks, there were 100 people on the island of Great Britain and none on the island of Ireland with the surname Soh as of 2011.

The 2010 United States Census found 757 people with the surname Soh, making it the 30,767th-most-common name in the country. This represented an increase from 516 people (40,019th-most-common) in the 2000 Census. In both censuses, about nine-tenths of the bearers of the surname identified as Asian, and about 5% as White.

People
People with one of these surnames spelled as Soh in English include:
Soh Kwang-pom (1859–1897), Korean reformist of the late Joseon Dynasty
Soh Jaipil (1864–1961), Korean independence activist and medical doctor
Soh Chin Ann (born 1950), Malaysian footballer
Soh Hang-suen (1951–2013), Hong Kong actress
Shigeru Soh (born 1953), Japanese long-distance runner, twin brother of Takeshi
Takeshi Soh (born 1953), Japanese long-distance runner, twin brother of Shigeru
June-Young Soh (born 1965), South Korean director and musician
Cavin Soh (born 1970), Singaporean actor
Hany Soh (born 1987), Singaporean politician
Elson Soh (born 1988), Singaporean singer
Charmaine Soh (born 1990), Singaporean netball player
Debra W. Soh (born 1990), Canadian neuroscientist and science journalist
Soh Rui Yong (born 1991), Singaporean long-distance runner
Soh Wooi Yik (born 1998), Malaysian badminton player
Loïc Mbe Soh (born 2001), Cameroonian-born French footballer
Chunghee Sarah Soh, South Korean-born American anthropologist
Kopi Soh, pseudonym of a Malaysian author

See also
Fikri Che Soh (born 1998), Malaysian footballer (Che Soh is a patronymic, not a surname)

References